William, Prince of Wales, has received numerous titles, decorations and honorary appointments both during his time as Duke of Cambridge and Prince of Wales. Each is listed below; where two dates are shown, the first indicates the date of receiving the title or award (the title as Prince William of Wales being given as from his birth) and the second indicates the date of its loss or renunciation.

Royal and noble titles and styles

 1982 – 29 April 2011: His Royal Highness Prince William of Wales
 29 April 2011 – 8 September 2022: His Royal Highness The Duke of Cambridge
 In Scotland: 29 April 2011 – 8 September 2022: His Royal Highness The Earl of Strathearn
 8–9 September 2022: His Royal Highness The Duke of Cornwall and Cambridge
 In Scotland: 8 September 2022 – present: His Royal Highness The Duke of Rothesay
 9 September 2022 – present: His Royal Highness The Prince of Wales

From birth, William has been a British prince with the style of Royal Highness. From birth until his marriage, he had the territorial designation "of Wales". On his wedding day, 29 April 2011, his grandmother Elizabeth II created him Duke of Cambridge, Earl of Strathearn and Baron Carrickfergus. The letters patent granting these titles were issued on 26 May that year. Between his marriage and his father's accession to the throne, he was referred to as the Duke of Cambridge outside Scotland, and as the Earl of Strathearn within Scotland.

On the demise of Elizabeth II and the accession of his father on 8 September 2022, as the eldest son of the monarch, he automatically became in England the Duke of Cornwall and in Scotland the Duke of Rothesay, Earl of Carrick, Baron of Renfrew, Lord of the Isles and Prince and Great Steward of Scotland. On 9 September 2022, the King announced the appointment of William as Prince of Wales; this title and that of Earl of Chester were granted by letters patent dated 13 February 2023. He is now referred to as the Prince of Wales outside Scotland, and as the Duke of Rothesay within Scotland.

Surname
As a British prince, William does not use a surname for everyday purposes. For formal and ceremonial purposes, children of the Prince of Wales use the title "prince" or "princess" before their forename and follow it with their father's territorial designation. Thus, before becoming a duke when he married, Prince William was styled "Prince William of Wales". Such territorial designations are discarded by women when they marry and by men if they become peers in their own right, such as when Prince William was made a duke.

Although the name of the royal house is Windsor, the surname Mountbatten-Windsor belongs to all the children and male-line descendants of Queen Elizabeth II and Prince Philip, and is used, if needed, by those who do not have the style of Royal Highness and the title Prince or Princess; when a female descendant marries, she traditionally takes her husband's surname from that point onward, and their children take their father's. Both Princes William and Harry used Wales as their surname for military purposes; this continued to be the case for William after his creation as Duke of Cambridge.

Military ranks

 
 8 January 2006: Officer cadet
 16 December 2006: Cornet (Second Lieutenant), The Blues and Royals (short service commission)
 16 December 2006: Lieutenant, The Blues and Royals
 1 January 2009: Captain, The Blues and Royals (and transferred to a full regular commission)
 1 January 2016: Major
 
 1 January 2008: Sub-lieutenant
 1 January 2009: Lieutenant
 1 January 2016: Lieutenant Commander
 
 1 January 2008: Flying Officer
 1 January 2009: Flight Lieutenant
 1 January 2016: Squadron Leader

University degrees

Commonwealth realms

Appointments (Shown in order in which appointments were made, not order of precedence)

Decorations and medals (Shown in order in which appointments were made, not order of precedence)

Wear of orders, decorations and medals
The ribbons worn regularly by William in undress uniform are as follows:

With medals, William normally wears the breast stars of the Garter and Thistle. When only one should be worn, he wears the Order of the Garter star, except in Scotland where the Scottish Order of the Thistle star is worn.

Honorary military appointments

 Canada
  10 November 2009: Honorary Canadian Ranger

 United Kingdom
  Since 8 August 2006: Commodore-in-Chief of the Royal Navy Submarine Service
  Since 8 August 2006: Commodore-in-Chief of Scotland
  Since 3 October 2008: Honorary Air Commandant of RAF Coningsby
  10 February 2011 – 21 December 2022: Colonel of the Irish Guards
  Since 21 December 2022: Colonel of the Welsh Guards

Non-national titles and honours

Member and fellowships

Religious

Honorific eponyms

Buildings
 : Duke of Cambridge Public School, Bowmanville, Ontario

Awards
 : Their Royal Highnesses The Duke and Duchess of Cambridge Award, University of Waterloo, Waterloo, Ontario
 : Duke and Duchess of Cambridge's Parks Canada Youth Ambassadors Program

Flowers
 Royal William rose

See also
 List of titles and honours of Charles III
 List of titles and honours of Queen Camilla
 List of titles and honours of Catherine, Princess of Wales
 List of titles and honours of Anne, Princess Royal
 List of titles and honours of Elizabeth II
 List of titles and honours of Prince Philip, Duke of Edinburgh
 List of titles and honours of George VI
 List of titles and honours of Queen Elizabeth The Queen Mother
 List of titles and honours of Mary of Teck
 List of titles and honours of Prince Arthur, Duke of Connaught and Strathearn
 List of honours of the British royal family by country

Notes

References

William, Prince of Wales
Lists of titles by person of the United Kingdom
British monarchy-related lists
Commonwealth royal styles

Knights of the Garter
Knights of the Thistle